NotCo is a unicorn Chilean food-tech company producing plant-based alternatives to animal-based food products. NotCo was founded in 2015 by Matias Muchnick, Pablo Zamora and Karim Pichara and utilizes machine learning to replicate dairy products in plant-based forms. NotCo is Latin America's fastest growing food company.

History 
NotCo was founded in Chile in 2015 by three technologists; Matias Muchnick (CEO), Karim Pichara (CTO), and Pablo Zamora. NotCo is now part-owned by The Craftory, Jeff Bezos' Bezos Expeditions and others.

NotCo was created with the view of using artificial intelligence. Its algorithm, Giuseppe, whose first version was created by Karim Pichara, which was patented in 2021, utilizes lists of plant ingredients to find the ideal combinations to recreate specific food attributes. This aims to replicate various food tastes, textures and cooking behaviors. Its NotMilk includes both pineapple and cabbage, allowing it to cook in the same way as cow's milk.

Products 
NotCo's current product line includes NotMayo, NotMilk (1%, 2% and whole), NotIceCream and NotBurger. As NotCo expanded from Chile to Brazil and the rest of Latin America, it brought these products to new markets. As of 2021, the US market only holds NotMilk, retailed at Whole Foods Market, Sprouts Farmers Market, Wegmans and others.

 Not Mayo
 Not Milk
 Not IceCream
 Not Burger
 Not Meat

Collaborations 
As of 2021, 'NotMeat' is being used across Chile supplying both Burger King and Papa John's pizzerias' vegan options.

Investments 
In September 2020, NotCo raised $85m in a Series C funding round. Its investors include challenger brand VC fund The Craftory, Jeff Bezos' Bezos Expeditions and others. This funding has likely been used to fund NotCo's US debut in November 2020.

Awards 
In 2021, NotCo was announced among Fast Companys "World’s Most Innovative Companies".

References 

Chilean companies established in 2015